The Ladywell Arena is a multiple use sports arena in Ladywell in Lewisham, London, England. It is used by the Kent and Blackheath Harriers athletic clubs and the Lewisham Borough and Forest Hill Park football clubs.

Facilities
The arena has a six lane 400m all weather running track, a football pitch and a gym. The stadium is also floodlit.

Transport
The stadium is served by Ladywell and Catford Bridge railway stations.

London Bus services for the arena are:

See also 

Ladywell Leisure Centre

External links 
Lewisham Leisure Centres
Runtrack

References 

Athletics venues in London
Sport in the London Borough of Lewisham
Football venues in England